Wongo may refer to:

 Wongo (music producer), Australian DJ
 Wongo language, a Bantu language
 Wongo National Park, a nature park in Mali
 The Wild Women of Wongo, a 1958 film
 Wongo the circle, an animated character by Lucas Apple